Eli Kristiansen (born 8 November 1933 in Vågan) is a Norwegian politician for the Christian Democratic Party.

From 1972 to 1973, during the cabinet Korvald, Kristiansen was appointed political secretary (today known as political advisor) in the Ministry of Social Affairs. From 1985 to 1986, during the second cabinet Willoch, she was State Secretary in the same Ministry. She was elected to the Norwegian Parliament from Oslo in 1977, but was not re-elected in 1981. She had previously served as a deputy representative from Nordland during the term 1973–1977.

On the local level she was a member of Namsos municipal council from 1965 to 1971. She was a member of the central party board from 1971 to 1973 and 1977 to 1981.

Outside politics she worked in the health sector, and was active in her trade union.

References

1933 births
Living people
Members of the Storting
Politicians from Oslo
Nordland politicians
Norwegian state secretaries
Christian Democratic Party (Norway) politicians
Norwegian trade unionists
Women members of the Storting
20th-century Norwegian politicians
20th-century Norwegian women politicians
Norwegian women state secretaries
People from Vågan